"My Love’s in Germany" (My Luve's in Germanie) is a poem written by Scottish poet Hector Macneill. It was first printed in 1794 and is the lament of a Scottish woman for her lover.

The song was re-published in 1885 by Colonel David Balfour as an Orkney melody composed by Colonel Thomas Traill around 1630. Traill (from  Holland Farm, that is "the farm on the high land", in Papa Westray), was a soldier in the army of Gustavus Adolphus, also known as Germany Thomas, during the Thirty Years' War.

The tune was later used by Robert Burns for his song "Ye Jacobites by Name".

German folk-rock band dArtagnan covered the song in 2022, together with Zora Cock from Blackbriar.

References

Folk ballads
Irish folk songs
Scottish folk songs